Charles Edward Rawdon-Hastings, 11th Earl of Loudoun  (5 January 1855 – 17 May 1920) was a Scottish peer.

Early life
At his birth on 5 January 1855, he was given the name Charles Edward Abney-Hastings. He was the eldest son of Charles Abney-Hastings, 1st Baron Donington and Edith Rawdon-Hastings, 10th Countess of Loudoun. His elder sister, Lady Flora Hastings married Henry Fitzalan-Howard, 15th Duke of Norfolk.  Among his younger siblings were Hon. Paulyn Rawdon-Hastings (who married Lady Maud Grimston, daughter of James Grimston, 2nd Earl of Verulam), Gilbert Clifton-Hastings-Campbell, 3rd Baron Donington (who married Maud Kemble Hamilton, daughter of Sir Charles Hamilton, 1st Baronet).

Career
On 23 January 1874, he succeeded his mother as 11th Earl of Loudoun as well as her subsidiary titles. On 8 April 1887 his name was legally changed to Charles Edward Rawdon-Hastings by Royal Licence. On 24 July 1895, he succeeded his father as 2nd Baron Donington.

He was a Lieutenant in the Leicestershire Yeomanry Cavalry and was Deputy Lieutenant of Ayrshire.

Personal life
On 4 February 1880, he married the Hon. Alice Fitzalan-Howard (1856–1915) in London. Alice was the daughter of Edward Fitzalan-Howard, 1st Baron Howard of Glossop and, his first wife, Augusta Talbot (only daughter and heiress of Hon. George Henry Talbot, half-brother of John Talbot, 16th Earl of Shrewsbury). They had no children.

Lady Loudon died on 10 May 1915. Lord Loudon died at Ashby-de-la-Zouch in North West Leicestershire on 17 May 1920. On his death, his titles were divided between his nieces (the daughters of his brother Paulyn), and his younger brother, Gilbert.

References

External links

|-

1855 births
1920 deaths
Earls of Loudoun
Charles
Deputy Lieutenants of Ayrshire
Barons Hastings
Barons Botreaux
Barons Hungerford
2
Eldest sons of British hereditary barons